Utricularia kumaonensis is a small annual carnivorous plant that belongs to the genus Utricularia. It is native to Bhutan, northern Burma, the Yunnan province of China, India, and Nepal. It was originally described by Daniel Oliver in 1859, although Peter Taylor asserted in his 1989 monograph that Michael Pakenham Edgeworth's 1847 description of Diurospermum album is U. kumaonensis. It is very similar to U. multicaulis.

The Latin specific epithet kumaonensis refers to Kumaon (a former kingdom) in Uttarakhand, India.

See also 
 List of Utricularia species

References 

kumaonensis
Flora of Bhutan
Flora of Myanmar
Flora of China
Flora of West Himalaya
Flora of Nepal
Carnivorous plants of Asia
Epiphytes
Plants described in 1859
Taxa named by Daniel Oliver